The 27th Golden Melody Awards was held in Taipei, Taiwan in 2016. The award ceremony for the popular music categories was hosted by Mickey Huang and broadcast on TTV on 25 June. The award ceremony for the traditional music categories was held at the National Center for Traditional Arts on 13 August.

Winners and nominees
Below is the list of key nominees and winners for the popular music categories. Winners are highlighted in bold.

Vocal category – Music publishing awards

Song of the Year 

 "Pisawad" – Suming
 "Matriarchy" – AMIT
 "Twilight"  – JJ Lin
 "Rainy Night" – Sodagreen
 "A Little Happiness" – Hebe Tien

Best Mandarin Album 

 Winter Endless – Sodagreen
 Swing Inc. – Peggy Hsu
 Progress Reports – Eli Hsieh
 AMIT2 – AMIT
 Aphasia – Tanya Chua
 Infinity – PoeTek

Best Music Video 

 "When Sorrow Being Downloaded Twice"(Sandee Chan) – Tan Tsung-fan
 "Eternal Summer" (Mayday) – Su Chien-i
 "I'm Not Yours" (Jolin Tsai) – Muh Chen
 "I Am Alive" (JJ Lin feat. Jason Mraz) – Liu Keng-ming
 "King of Doubt" (Hush) – Chen Hung-i

Vocal category – Individual awards

Best Mandarin Male Singer

 JJ Lin – From M.E. to Myself
 Namewee – Asian Killer 2015
 Li Jian – Li Jian
 Kowen Ko – If You Still Wander
 Matzka – Southeast Beauty

Best Mandarin Female Singer 

 Julia Peng – Darling
 Peggy Hsu – Swing Inc.
 Huang Qishan – Xiao Xia
 Su Yunying – Ming Ming
 AMIT – AMIT2
 Tanya Chua – Aphasia

Best Band 

Sodagreen – Winter Endless

Best Group 

 Chang and Lee – Chang and Lee

Best New Artist 

 Eli Hsieh – Progress Reports

Special awards

Lifetime Contribution Award 
Tracy Huang

References

Golden Melody Awards
Golden Melody Awards
Golden Melody Awards
Golden Melody Awards
Golden Melody Awards